Balan Ridge (‘Hrebet Balan’ \'hre-bet ba-'lan\) is the ridge rising in its southern part to  in the Sofia University Mountains on Alexander Island in Antarctica.

Balan Ridge is named for the Bulgarian linguist, historian and bibliographer Aleksandar Teodorov-Balan (1859–1959), first rector of Sofia University and one of the founders of the tourist movement in Bulgaria.

Location
British mapping in 1963.

See also
Arenite Ridge
Polarstar Ridge
Grikurov Ridge

Maps
British Antarctic Territory. Scale 1:200000 topographic map No. 3127. DOS 610 – W 69 70. Tolworth, UK, 1971
 Antarctic Digital Database (ADD). Scale 1:250000 topographic map of Antarctica. Scientific Committee on Antarctic Research (SCAR), 1993–2016.

Notes

References
Balan Ridge. SCAR Composite Gazetteer of Antarctica.
 Bulgarian Antarctic Gazetteer. Antarctic Place-names Commission. (details in Bulgarian, basic data in English)

External links
 Balan Ridge. Copernix satellite image

Ridges of Alexander Island
Bulgaria and the Antarctic